John LoCascio (born November 25, 1991 in Paterson, New Jersey) is a lacrosse player for the Dallas Rattlers in Major League Lacrosse.

A native of Fairfield Township, Essex County, New Jersey, LoCascio attended West Essex High School.

Professional MLL career
LoCascio was selected with the 26th pick of the 2014 Major League Lacrosse Collegiate Draft by the Rochester Rattlers. In his rookie season LoCascio appeared in 11 games and managed to gain 3 points and 44 ground balls. In his second season of play, LoCascio played in 15 games managing to obtain 6 points and 69 ground balls.

LoCascio went with the team in its move to Dallas, Texas in 2018. He played in 4 games getting 1 goal and 1 assist with 11 ground balls.

Prep and college career
At Villanova, LoCascio played as a long-stick midfielder where he appeared in 61 games and gathered 28 points.

NCAA Statistics

References

1991 births
Living people
Rochester Rattlers players
Dallas Rattlers players
American lacrosse players
People from Fairfield Township, Essex County, New Jersey
Sportspeople from Paterson, New Jersey
Villanova Wildcats men's lacrosse players
West Essex High School alumni